Abdulrahman Kanoo International School (ARKIS) is a private school in Bahrain and was established in 1997. It is a co-educational and bilingual school. It was the first school in Bahrain to receive joint accreditation from CIS (Council of International School).

Curriculum

ARKIS is a certified Cambridge International (CIE) Centre. The Cambridge International Primary Programme (CIPP) is implemented in Preschool and Elementary School along with the International Primary Curriculum (IPC), followed by the Cambridge Lower Secondary Programme (CLSP) in the Middle School, the International General Certificate of Secondary Education (IGCSE) in Grades 9 and 10. In Grades 11 and 12, students opt either for IB (International Baccalaureate) Diploma Programme (IBDP).

In addition to the above programmes, Universal Concept of Mental Arithmetic System (UCMAS), a brain development programme, is implemented from KG1 to Grade 8. The school implements subjects endorsed by Ministry of Education i.e. Islamic, Social Studies and Citizenship. ARKIS has an established Arabic Second Language department (ASL) for assisting students who are non-native speakers from Grade 1.

External links

 

International Baccalaureate schools in Bahrain
International schools in Bahrain
British international schools in Asia
Education in Manama
Buildings and structures in Manama